A City Dressed in Dynamite is the debut album by That Handsome Devil, released in 2008. It was recorded at Cybersound Studios in Boston, Massachusetts. The songs featured on the album are darker in tone and content than those on the band's debut EP, with some dealing explicitly with drug addiction and death. The album includes numerous samples of the 1967 educational video "Narcotics: Pit of Despair". The cover art and illustrations in the album booklet were done by Neil "Women 158" Parkinson.

Track listing 

Notes

 "Atom Shell" appears as a hidden track on the physical CD.
 The iTunes exclusive bonus tracks are "Karaoke Burial" and "Power Drunk".
 The eMusic exclusive bonus tracks are "Powderbomb" and "Romance is Dead".

Personnel 
 Godforbid – lead vocals
 Jeremy Page – guitar, bass, keyboard, banjo, pedal steel, glockenspiel, percussion, accordion, synthesizers, kazoo, backing vocals
 Naoko Takamoto – backing vocals
 Andy Bauer – drums, percussion, accordion, guitar, backing vocals
 Evan Sanders – keyboard, trumpet, trombone
 Martin Rodriguez – guitar
 DJ Beyonder – turntable
 Lucas Lajuene – violin
 Benjamin Powell – violin
 Fabrizio Mazzetta – cello

Appearances 
 "Rob the Prez-O-Dent" is featured in Rock Band 2.
 A portion of "Mexico" was featured in the seventh episode of Weeds, "Yes I Can".
 "Squares" is featured in Reaper in the episode "Rebellion".

References 

2008 albums
That Handsome Devil albums